The  was the thirteenth season of the Japan Football League, the third tier of the Japanese football league system. It was scheduled to begin at 13 March 2011 and to end at 27 November 2011; however, the start of the season has been delayed to 23 April due to the aftermath of the 2011 Tōhoku earthquake and tsunami. As a result, the ending date of the season was moved to 11 December.

Overview

At the end of the 2010 season, two new clubs, Kamatamare Sanuki and Nagano Parceiro, were promoted from the Japanese Regional Leagues by virtue of their final placing in the Regional League promotion series.

Kamatamare Sanuki were approved as J. League associate members at the annual meeting in February. Applications by Zweigen Kanazawa and FC Ryukyu were given "continuous deliberations" status with further efforts required to obtain the membership.

The earthquake and tsunami led to significant changes in competition schedule. Besides the postponement of the tournament, Sony Sendai, who were the most affected by disaster and could not recover in time, asked the league to put them on temporary hiatus. Missing the first eleven rounds (7th to 17th), Sony re-joined the league on 3 July and continued participation from then on. The final tournament schedule is as follows:
 Every team in the league will play 33 games: Two against each other (home and away) and one against Sony Sendai according to the schedule of the second half of the tournament (rounds 18th to 34th).
 Sony Sendai will play 17 games against every other team in the second half of the tournament.
 Sony Sendai will also participate in the rescheduled games of rounds 1–6, called "Matches for reconstruction assistance of Tōhoku earthquake and tsunami" (東日本大震災 災害復興支援試合). Although those games are treated as official JFL matches, they will not be included into the league results.
 For the purpose of determining the relegated teams, Sony Sendai can add points gained in six aforementioned "reconstruction" games to their official 17-match outcome. Thus, Sony Sendai will be judged by 23 matches, while every other team – by 33.

On 3 August JEF Reserves had submitted a request of withdrawal from the league at the end of the season due to difficult financial conditions and poor performances of the team. The request was approved by the league Board on 12 September.

In the penultimate round Sagawa Shiga won their third JFL championship in only five years of existence, firmly placing themselves among the strongest amateur teams in Japan. Two clubs, Machida Zelvia and Matsumoto Yamaga were promoted to J. League.

By virtue of their placing in the Regional League promotion series, three clubs were promoted to JFL at the end of the season: YSCC Yokohama, Fujieda MYFC, and Hoyo AC Elan Oita. Because of JEF Reserves' withdrawal, no additional promotion and relegation play-offs were held.

Table

Results

Top scorers

Attendance

References

External links
Official site

2011
3